The 1982 Redbridge Council election took place on 6 May 1982 to elect members of Redbridge London Borough Council in London, England. The whole council was up for election and the Conservative party stayed in overall control of the council.

Background

Election result

Ward results

References

1982
1982 London Borough council elections
May 1982 events in the United Kingdom